Zenometridae is a family of echinoderms belonging to the order Comatulida.

Genera:
 Psathyrometra Clark, 1907
 Sarametra Clark, 1917
 Zenometra Clark, 1907

References

Comatulida
Echinoderm families